Spanish singer Rosalía has released three studio albums, one extended play, and twenty-seven singles (including five as a featured artist). The singer released her debut album Los Ángeles in 2017 but gained worldwide recognition with her second studio album El Mal Querer (2018). The album, which debuted at number one in Spain and is certified triple platinum in the country, spawned four singles, including "Malamente", "Pienso en tu mirá" and "Di mi nombre". During the following years, Rosalía released the smash hits "Con Altura" with J Balvin and El Guincho, "Yo x Ti, Tu x Mi" with Ozuna and "TKN" with Travis Scott.

Studio albums

EPs

Singles

As lead artist

As featured artist

Promotional singles

Other charted songs

Guest appearances

Voice sampled in

Music videos

Cameos and guest appearances

Songwriting credits

Footnotes

Notes for peak chart positions

References

Discographies of Spanish artists
Discography